Niklas Dams (born 28 May 1990) is a German footballer who plays as a defender for Borussia Dortmund II.

References

External links
 

German footballers
Association football defenders
Footballers from Düsseldorf
1990 births
Living people
Borussia Mönchengladbach II players
Servette FC players
SV Wehen Wiesbaden players
Borussia Dortmund II players
2. Bundesliga players
3. Liga players
Regionalliga players
Swiss Challenge League players